AŠK Maria Huta is a Slovak football team, based in the town of Gelnica.

Current squad

Colours
Club colours are orange and black.

References

External links
Club website 
  
Club profile at Futbalnet.sk 

Football clubs in Slovakia
Association football clubs established in 2009